Pouteria foveolata is a species of plant in the family Sapotaceae. It is found in Costa Rica and Nicaragua.

References

foveolata
Vulnerable plants
Taxonomy articles created by Polbot